The Republic of China (ROC) had always competed in the Olympic Games under that name except for the second time under the name of Chinese Taipei, and the first Winter Games, at the 1984 Winter Olympics in Sarajevo, Yugoslavia. The change in name was a result of the Nagoya Resolution, adopted by the International Olympic Committee (IOC) in 1979 due to objections raised in the 1970s by the People's Republic of China (PRC) over the political status of Taiwan. The IOC restrictions over the ROC name had led the ROC to boycott the Summer Games of 1976 and 1980; the PRC had boycotted all the previous Olympic Games.

Alpine skiing

Men

Biathlon

Men

 1 A penalty loop of 150 metres had to be skied per missed target.
 2 One minute added per missed target.

Bobsleigh

Cross-country skiing

Men

Luge

Men

Women

References
Official Olympic Report (PDF)
 Olympic Winter Games 1984, full results by sports-reference.com

Nations at the 1984 Winter Olympics
1984
1984 in Taiwanese sport